Ramona Kapheim ( Jahnke, born 8 January 1958 in Strasburg, Bezirk Neubrandenburg) is a German rower.

References 
 
 

1958 births
Living people
People from Vorpommern-Greifswald
People from Bezirk Neubrandenburg
East German female rowers
Sportspeople from Brandenburg
Olympic rowers of East Germany
Rowers at the 1980 Summer Olympics
Olympic gold medalists for East Germany
Olympic medalists in rowing
World Rowing Championships medalists for East Germany
Medalists at the 1980 Summer Olympics
Recipients of the Patriotic Order of Merit in silver